Dendrobium falconeri, commonly known as 串珠石斛 (chuan zhu shi hu), is a species of orchid native to Asia.

It is native to southern China (Hunan, Yunnan), Taiwan, the Eastern Himalayas (Bhutan), Northeastern India (Arunachal Pradesh, Assam, and Sikkim), and northern Indochina (Myanmar, Thailand, Vietnam). The flowers are large and have white petals with purple tips. It grows on rocks and on tree trunks in dense forests.

References

falconeri
Flora of Indo-China
Flora of the Indian subcontinent
Orchids of China
Orchids of Taiwan
Plants described in 1856
Taxa named by William Jackson Hooker